Goldkinder (English: Gold Children)  is the third album by German deathcore band We Butter the Bread with Butter. It was released on August 9, 2013. The album entered the German Media Control chart at No. 27.

Their first single Pyroman & Astronaut hit #16 at German MetalRock Charts.

The song Meine Brille appeared in the BBC Radio 1 playlist. It is the first appearance of WBTBWB in the BBC Radio.

Track listing

Personnel
We Butter the Bread with Butter
 Paul "Борщ" Bartzsch — lead vocals
 Marcel "Marci" Neumann — guitars, keyboards, programming
 Maximilian Pauly Saux — bass
 Can Özgünsür — drums, keyboards

Chart performance

References

2013 albums
German-language albums
We Butter the Bread with Butter albums